The Very Best of Prince is a greatest hits album by American recording artist Prince. It was released on July 31, 2001, by Warner Bros. Records. The album contains most of his commercially successful singles from 1979 to 1991 including the US number 1s "When Doves Cry", "Let's Go Crazy", "Kiss" and "Cream".

The Very Best of Prince does not include the US number 1 hit "Batdance" most likely due to the licensing of the character Batman. AllMusic supposes that the Batman album is being unofficially written out of his discography. All the songs included in this compilation were all previously included in the 3-disc box set The Hits/The B-Sides (1993), with the exception of "Money Don't Matter 2 Night".

Commercial performance 
On the chart dated August 18, 2001, The Very Best of Prince debuted at number 66 on the US Billboard 200. As of September 21, 2004, the album was certified platinum by the Recording Industry Association of America (RIAA) for selling 1 million copies in the United States.

The Very Best of Prince sold 179,000 album-equivalent units (100,000 in pure album sales) in the week following Prince's death, thus allowing the album to re-enter the Billboard 200 at number one; this makes the album Prince's fifth number-one on the chart. The following week the album fell to number two on the Billboard 200 chart, selling 391,000 equivalent copies (216,000 in pure album sales) behind Beyoncé's Lemonade. In 2016, the album has sold 660,000 recognized copies in the United States in addition to the over 2 million copies sold prior to 2016.

Track listing
All songs are written by and credited to Prince, except where noted.

Personnel
 Prince – lead vocals and various instruments

The Revolution
 Lisa Coleman – keyboards, vocals
 Wendy Melvoin – guitar, vocals
 Bobby Z. – drums, percussion
 Brown Mark – bass, vocals
 Matt (Dr.) Fink – keyboards, vocals

The New Power Generation
 Levi Seacer Jr. – rhythm guitar, backing vocals
 Tony M. – rapping, backing vocals
 Tommy Barbarella – "PurpleAxxe" sampling, keyboards
 Kirk Johnson – percussion, backing vocals
 Damon Dickson – percussion, backing vocals
 Sonny T. – bass, backing vocals
 Michael B. – drums
 Rosie Gaines – vocals, "PurpleAxxe" sampling, organ

Additional musicians
 Jill Jones – co-lead vocals (on "1999")
 Dez Dickerson – co-lead vocals (on "1999" & "Little Red Corvette"), lead guitar (on "Little Red Corvette")
 Mazarati – backing vocals (on "Kiss")
 Sheena Easton – vocals (on "U Got the Look")
 Sheila E. – drums, percussion (on "U Got the Look" & "Alphabet St."), vocals (on "Alphabet St.")
 Cat Glover – rap (on "Alphabet St.")
 Eric Leeds – brass, vocals (on "Alphabet St."), flute (on "Gett Off")

Charts

Weekly charts

Monthly charts

Year-end charts

Certifications

References 

2001 greatest hits albums
Prince (musician) compilation albums
Albums produced by Prince (musician)
Warner Records compilation albums
Compilation albums of number-one songs